Nakhonratchasima may refer to:
Nakhon Ratchasima, a city in Thailand
Nakhon Ratchasima Province, a province of Thailand
Nakhon Ratchasima (men's volleyball), a volleyball men's club in Thailand
Nakhon Ratchasima (women's volleyball), a volleyball women's club in Thailand